Bobby Ray Baldock (born January 24, 1936) is an American attorney and jurist serving as a Senior United States circuit judge of the United States Court of Appeals for the Tenth Circuit. He was previously a United States district judge of the United States District Court for the District of New Mexico.

Early life and education

Baldock was born in Rocky, Oklahoma and graduated from New Mexico Military Institute in 1956. He received a Juris Doctor from the University of Arizona College of Law in 1960.

Career 
Baldock was a Captain and Adjutant General Staff in the New Mexico National Guard from 1960 to 1970. He also operated a private legal practice in Roswell, New Mexico from 1960 to 1983. He was an adjunct professor at Eastern New Mexico University–Roswell from 1962 to 1981.

Federal judicial service

Baldock was nominated by President Ronald Reagan on May 2, 1983, to a seat on the United States District Court for the District of New Mexico vacated by Judge Edwin L. Mechem. He was confirmed by the United States Senate on June 6, 1983, and received his commission on June 7, 1983. Baldock's service was terminated on January 24, 1986, due to elevation to the Tenth Circuit.

Baldock was nominated by President Reagan on October 7, 1985, to a seat on the United States Court of Appeals for the Tenth Circuit vacated by Judge Oliver Seth. He was confirmed by the Senate on December 16, 1985, and received his commission on December 17, 1985. He assumed senior status on January 26, 2001.

Notes

References
  

1936 births
20th-century American judges
James E. Rogers College of Law alumni
Judges of the United States Court of Appeals for the Tenth Circuit
Judges of the United States District Court for the District of New Mexico
Living people
New Mexico Military Institute alumni
United States Army officers
United States court of appeals judges appointed by Ronald Reagan
United States district court judges appointed by Ronald Reagan
Eastern New Mexico University faculty
Judges of the United States Foreign Intelligence Surveillance Court of Review